CPM 22  is a Brazilian hardcore band from São Paulo formed in 1995. Band members are Badauí (vocals), Luciano (guitar), Phil (guitar), Ali (bass) and Daniel (drums).

History 
With influences from the Ramones, the Misfits, Buzzcocks, Face to Face, Pennywise, Green Day, and other old school punk and hardcore legends, CPM 22 recorded their first demo tape in 1998.

Their popularity in the Brazilian underground scene led CPM 22 to record the independent album A Alguns Quilômetros de Lugar Algum (A Few Kilometers From Nowhere). Two years later they were included in the Brazilian MTV video-music award in the demo clip category with "Anteontem" (The Day Before Yesterday).

In 2001, they signed with Abril Music and released their first mainstream album called CPM 22 with many hits, including "Regina, Let's Go", "Tarde de Outubro" (October Afternoon) and "O Mundo Dá Voltas" (The World Turns), playing on Brazilian radios.

At the end of 2002, they released Chegou a Hora de Recomeçar (Now's The Time To Start Over). CPM 22 reached the top of their popularity in Brazil with songs including "Desconfio" (I Suspect), "Ontem" (Yesterday), "Não Sei Viver Sem Ter Você" (I Don't Know How to Live Without You), "Dias Atrás" (Days Ago), and "Atordoado" (Stunned).

They are often seen on Brazilian television shows, remarkable for a band which recently played in the São Paulo underground. Such popularity led to complaints from old-time fans that the band had "sold out", forgetting its roots by creating songs to be played on top 40 radios and populist Sunday TV shows like Domingão do Faustão and Domingo Legal.

Discography

Studio albums

Live albums 

(2006) MTV ao Vivo (MTV Live)
(2013) CPM 22 Acústico (CPM 22 Acoustic)
(2016) CPM 22 ao Vivo no Rock in Rio (CPM 22 Live at Rock in Rio)

Demo albums 
(1996) Como por Moral (As for Morals)
(1998) CPM 22 (CPM 22)

Singles

Promotional singles 
2012: "Derrota e Glória"

References

External links
Official Site

Musical groups established in 1995
Emo musical groups
Brazilian hardcore punk groups
Latin Grammy Award winners